Talata may refer to:

Talata Embalo (born 1963), Guinea-Bissauan amateur wrestler
Talata Ampano, a town and commune in Madagascar
Talata Mafara, a Local Government Area in Zamfara State, Nigeria
Talata Vohimena, a town and commune in Madagascar

See also
Thalatha, a genus of moths